Green Spring Gardens (31 acres) is a public park, including a historic 18th-century plantation house "Green Spring", which is the heart of a national historic district listed on the National Register of Historic Places in 2003. The Fairfax County Park Authority operates Green Spring with the assistance of various nonprofit organizations concerned with history and gardening. Open daily without charge, the street address is 4603 Green Spring Road, Alexandria, Virginia.

Holdings
The historic district encompasses two contributing buildings, two contributing sites, and two contributing structures located within the park. It includes the brick farmhouse, built about 1777–1784, a 19th-century spring house, a family cemetery, archaeological site, subterranean brick vault, and a small 4-chambered stone structure. The property's landscape was redesigned in 1942, in the Colonial Revival style by noted landscape architects Beatrix Farrand and Walter Macomber. The house and grounds were donated to Fairfax County in 1970 by New Republic publisher Michael Whitney Straight and his wife Belinda Straight, who had moved their family to Washington D.C. during Massive Resistance.

Its estate gardens (popular among local wedding photographers) feature boxwood hedging, roses, and perennial as well as annual borders. The park also has a tropical greenhouse, a wooded stream valley with ponds and gazebo, a naturalistic native plant garden, and over 20 demonstration gardens. It is a member of the North American Plant Collections Consortium for its Hamamelis collection (130 taxa, including all 4 species).

Gallery

See also
 List of botanical gardens in the United States

References

External links
 Green Spring Farm, 4601 Green Spring Road, Annandale, Fairfax County, VA: 2 photos at Historic American Buildings Survey
 Green Spring Gardens Park

Botanical gardens in Virginia
Parks in Fairfax County, Virginia
Virginia municipal and county parks
Museums in Fairfax County, Virginia
Houses completed in 1784
Houses on the National Register of Historic Places in Virginia
Houses in Fairfax County, Virginia
National Register of Historic Places in Fairfax County, Virginia
Historic American Buildings Survey in Virginia
Historic districts on the National Register of Historic Places in Virginia